Lucas Noguera Paz (born 5 October 1993) is an Argentine rugby union footballer who recently played as a loosehead prop for Bath in Premiership Rugby and for Argentina.

Noguera Paz was a member of the Argentina Under-20 side which competed in the 2013 IRB Junior World Championship in France.   He went on to represent the Pampas XV on their 2014 tour of Australia and made his senior international debut later in the year against  where he also managed a debut try.   He featured against  the following week and played all 3 of his country's games during the 2014 mid-year rugby union internationals series. In August 2014, he was named in the Pumas squad for the 2014 Rugby Championship.

References

1993 births
Living people
Sportspeople from San Miguel de Tucumán
Rugby union props
Pampas XV players
Jaguares (Super Rugby) players
Argentine rugby union players
Argentina international rugby union players
Bath Rugby players
Leeds Tykes players
Yacare XV players